Steroid receptor RNA activator 1 also known as steroid receptor RNA activator protein (SRAP) is a protein that in humans is encoded by the SRA1 gene.  The mRNA transcribed from the SRA1 gene is a component of the ribonucleoprotein complex containing NCOA1. This functional RNA also encodes a protein.

Function 

This gene is involved in transcriptional coactivation by steroid receptor. There is currently data suggesting this gene encodes both a non-coding RNA that functions as part of a ribonucleoprotein complex and a protein coding mRNA. Increased expression of both the transcript and the protein is associated with cancer.

Interactions 

SRA1 has been shown to interact with:
 Estrogen receptor alpha,
 DDX17,
 Nuclear receptor coactivator 2, and
 SPEN.

The SRAP has been shown to interact with its SRA RNA counterpart indirectly with the functional sub-structure STR7 of SRA RNA.  Originally proposed to be RRM containing, SRAP has been demonstrated to have a helix bundle at its C-terminal end while N-terminal to this domain appears unstructured.

References

Further reading

External links